Friedrich Deckel GmbH, also known as F.Deckel, was a German company founded by Friedrich Deckel and Christian Bruns in Munich as Bruns & Deckel in 1903. Its most famous product is the Compur line of leaf shutters used on many photographic lenses starting from 1911. Bruns and Deckel previously had worked together at C. A. Steinheil & Söhne; Bruns was an inventor responsible for developing leaf shutters while Deckel was a laboratory mechanic.

Corporate history
By 1910, Zeiss had acquired a 16.8% stake in F.Deckel. Zeiss also owned a siginficant portion of competitor  (AGC), which was later renamed Prontor after its competing leaf shutter. During World War II, photographic equipment production was paused and F.Deckel made fuel pumps for BMW airplane engines.

In 1958, Carl Zeiss AG purchased F.Deckel outright and in 1976 closed down the Compur factor in Munich, consolidating production with Prontor at Calmbach. Leaf shutter production continued after the two companies were merged in 1984 until 2002. A portion of the company, responsible for gas monitors, survives as Compur Monitors GmbH.

Leaf shutter development

Bruns designed Steinheil's first leaf shutter in 1899, followed by an updated version using a leather brake to control shutter speeds.

While at Bruns & Deckel, Bruns developed the Compound leaf shutter in 1905, which had a pneumatic escapement for slow speeds. After Bruns left the company shortly thereafter, it was renamed to F.Deckel; Bruns continued to develop shutters and replaced the pneumatic cylinder with a clockwork escapement in 1910, naming the new shutter Compur as a portmanteau of Compound (from the earlier shutter design) and Uhrwerk (referring to the clockwork mechanism). A consortium of photographic companies, including Carl Zeiss AG, Bausch & Lomb (25% of which was owned by Zeiss), and AGC was formed in 1910 to acquire Bruns's Compur patent, which was provided to Deckel, who produced Compur shutters under license starting in 1911. Zeiss owned significant stakes in both Deckel and Gauthier. The earliest shutters are marked with D.R.P. 258646 D.R.G.M. (Deutsche Reich Gebraumeister) for the original patent.

Leaf shutters are provided in standardized sizes. Compur shutters were marketed with smaller lenses (sizes #00 to #3), while Compound shutters continued to be provided for larger sizes (#4 and #5).

As introduced, the Compur leaf shutter used a dial to set shutter speeds; the early dial-set versions were succeeded by the rim-set version in 1927, which moved the shutter speed control to the outer rim of the shutter. A self-timer mechanism was added in 1928, which was labelled Compur S.

AGC released the similar Prontor leaf shutter design in 1935. The fastest speed should be selected prior to cocking the shutter, as a stiff secondary spring is engaged with the fastest speeds; other speeds may be selected after the shutter is cocked. In addition, the self-timer cannot be used with the fastest shutter speed. Early versions use three leaf blades, while Compur-Rapid versions used five. Flash synchronization was added via a coaxial PC terminal on the rim of the shutter in 1951, which bore the Synchro-Compur branding. Synchro-Compur shutters have an additional lever painted green, which allows the user to select electronic flash synchronization ("X") or flashbulb sync ("M"). Some Compur shutters have a trailing -P, indicating these shutters offer "press to focus" functionality. A separate button is provided that allows the photographer to open the shutter leaves to check focus on the ground glass without changing the shutter speed setting or tripping the shutter.

In the early 1970s, Deckel introduced electronically controlled shutters, branded as Compur-electronic. The 4.5 V PX21 battery required to operate these shutters is now out of production.

Exposure value

F.Deckel developed the exposure value (EV) scale, also known as the Light Value Scale, which is a single number that measures scene illumination on a base-2 logarithmic scale. Each EV corresponds to a several combinations of shutter speed and aperture settings that provide the proper exposure for the illumination of the scene. The EV scale was first used on Synchro-Compur shutters displayed at Photokina 1954.

Deckel-mount lenses

In the late 1950s, Deckel introduced a bayonet lens mount which was used mainly with 35mm leaf-shutter cameras built in Germany, including the Kodak Retina IIIS, Kodak Retina Reflex S, Braun Paxette Reflex, and Voigtländer Bessamatic. DKL-mount lenses for the Kodak cameras were made by both Schneider-Kreuznach and Rodenstock, while Voigtländer made their own lenses for the Bessamatic line. DKL-mount lenses became less popular as focal-plane shutter cameras became more prevalent in the 1960s, and production ceased by the early 1970s.

The original bayonet was introduced in 1956 with the Voigtländer Vitessa T, followed by the Braun Colorette Super II in 1957, which shared the  flange focal distance with the earlier Exakta system. Although the DKL-mount system is ostensibly compatible across manufacturers, camera manufacturers introduced variations in the mounting lug profiles and inclusion of an aperture control ring to physically prevent the attachment of lenses from other DKL-mount systems. For instance, the Schneider-Kreuznach and Rodenstock lenses made for the Kodak Retina S-mount do not fit Voigtländer cameras directly; a small physical modification to the mounting lugs will make them compatible. This was intended to prevent Voigtländer photographers from using less expensive Retina lenses.

DKL lens mount cameras include seven distinct variants (the earliest models released, Voigtländer Vitessa T and Braun Colorette Super II, share the same physical mount):

Notes

References

External links
  (similar "clockwork" leaf shutter patent assigned to Ilex Mfg. Co.)
 
 

Photography companies of Germany
1903 establishments in Germany